Jawa Timur Park, commonly known as Jatim Park, East Java Park, Eastern Java Park, or JTP, is a complex of recreational and learning parks located in Batu, East Java, Indonesia. The complex has 3 parks, Jatim Park 1, Jatim Park 2, and Jatim Park 3. Jatim Park is one of the tourism icons of East Java and one of the most famous amusement parks in Indonesia.

History 
Jatim Park was founded in 2001 by Paul Sendjojo. Jawa Timur Park Group has been working with the Department of Education and Culture, Municipality of Batu to ensure that every educational collection displayed is guaranteed quality. In addition, Jatim Park Group is also working with the Ministry of Environment and Forestry in developing Jawa Timur Park 2 content. This park also has the most extensive area, which is 22 hectares.

In 2016. human body museum with name or entitled "The Bagong Adventure" was inaugurated. This 1.4 hectare museum is only human body museum in Indonesia. The museum not only from the museum's content about the human body, but also from a collection of cadavers, or preserved human organs. Human Body Museum is the largest and rarest human body museum for having cadaver collections in Southeast Asia. In addition to the Human Body Museum, Jawa Timur Park Group recorded another record with the existence of Museum Angkut as the first and largest transportation museum in Asia. The automotive collection of more than 300 species spread over an area of 3.8 hectares.

In April 2017, Jawa Timur Park Group also officially cooperated with Indonesian Institute of Sciences (LIPI) to make adjustments to the data collection and management system of flora and fauna in each of the agreed-upon parks.

Jatim Park 1 
Jatim Park 1 has 36 amusement lands, including a giant swimming pool (with a background of the statue of Ken Dedes, Ken Arok, and Mpu Gandring), spinning coaster, and drop zone. Educational lands that are the centre of attention include Volcano and the Nusantara Gallery which also has agro plants, dioramas of endangered animals, and miniatures of temples. Jatim Park 1 is located at Jalan Kartika No. 2, which is adjacent to the Flower Club Resort Hotel.

Jatim Park 2 
Slightly different from Jatim Park 1 which is more intended as a playground and entertainment, Jatim Park 2 is more showing a learning park than a playground. Jatim Park 2 carries the concept of learning natural sciences, biology and learning animals that are presented with a background according to its habitat. Jatim Park 2 consists of wildlife museum, Batu Secret Zoo, and Pohon Inn Hotel. Jatim Park 2 is located at Jalan Oro-oro Ombo No. 9, which is adjacent to the Batu Night Spectacular.

Jatim Park 3 
The location of Jatim Park 3 is in Beji, District Junrejo. Jatim Park 3 carries the concept of a playground as well as education about ancient animals including dinosaurs. Visitors will be shown life from the dinosaurs and geologic period, from the beginning of civilization until the time after the extinction of the dinosaurs. The geologic era park is Permian, Triassic, Jurassic, Cretaceous and Ice Age epochs which became the age of dinosaur extinction because temperatures at this time were so extreme and frozen. East Java Park also has tours of the cultures of various worlds in each house that has architecture according to the culture of the country, known as the 5 periods culture park (Wisata Budaya 5 zaman). Jatim Park also has a World Music Gallery (Museum Musik Dunia), Fun Tech Plaza, The Legend Star and Millennial Glow Garden.

See also 

Museum Angkut
List of amusement parks in Asia

References

External links 

 Official website of Jawa Timur Park Group

Amusement parks opened in 2001
Amusement parks in Indonesia
Indonesian brands
2001 establishments in Indonesia
Companies based in Batu, East Java
Tourist attractions in East Java
East Java
Buildings and structures completed in 2001